Jordan Canzeri (born February 18, 1993) is an American football running back who is currently a free agent. He played college football for the University of Iowa Hawkeyes football team from 2011 to 2015.  He rushed for a career-high 256 yards on a school-record 43 carries against Illinois on October 10, 2015. He helped lead the 2015 Iowa Hawkeyes football team to an undefeated 12–0 record during the regular season, as he rushed for 976 yards during the  season.  He was selected by both the coaches and media as a third-team player on the 2015 All-Big Ten Conference football team. He played for the Elecom Kobe Finies of the X-League from 2016 to 2017.
On March 19, 2018, Canzeri was assigned to the Albany Empire. On March 31, 2018, he was placed on recallable reassignment.

College career

Statistics

References

1993 births
Living people
American football running backs
Iowa Hawkeyes football players
Players of American football from New York (state)
Sportspeople from Troy, New York
Albany Empire (AFL) players
American expatriate sportspeople in Japan
American expatriate players of American football